City routes are roads that serve a certain city in the Netherlands.

Only six cities make use of city routes in the Netherlands: Amsterdam, Almere, The Hague, Nijmegen, Rotterdam, and Zaanstad.

City routes in Amsterdam

City routes in Almere

City routes in The Hague

City routes in Nijmegen

City routes in Rotterdam

City routes in Zaanstad

References

City routes in the Netherlands